Hall of Memory is a name used for some memorials, including:
 The Hall of Memory, Birmingham, a war memorial in Birmingham, United Kingdom, honoring residents killed in World War I.
 The octagonal chapel at the heart of the Australian War Memorial's commemorative area, honoring Australians killed in battle.
 The underground portion of the National Museum of the Holodomor-Genocide in Kyiv, Ukraine, honoring those killed in the Holodomor.
 The Goomeri Hall of Memory, a community center in Goomeri, Australia, honoring residents who have served in any war.

The name may also sometimes be used for something akin to a hall of fame.

Types of monuments and memorials